Transworld Publishers Ltd. is a British publishing house in Ealing, London that is a division of Penguin Random House, one of the world's largest mass media groups. It was established in 1950 as the British division of American company Bantam Books. It publishes fiction and non fiction titles by various best-selling authors including Val Wood under several different imprints. Hardbacks are either published under the Doubleday or the Bantam Press imprint, whereas paperbacks are published under the Black Swan, Bantam or Corgi imprint.

Terry Pratchett First Novel Award
Transworld sponsors the Terry Pratchett First Novel Award for unpublished science-fiction novels.

See also
 List of largest UK book publishers

References

External links
Official website
Company history (as at 2012)
Corgi Books - a book series published by Transworld from the 1950s

1950 establishments in England
Book publishing companies of the United Kingdom
Companies based in the London Borough of Ealing
British companies established in 1950
Bertelsmann subsidiaries